In alchemy, chalcanthum, also called chalcanth or calcanthum, was a term used for the compound blue vitriol (CuSO4), and the ink made from it. The term was also applied to red vitriol (a native sulfate of cobalt), and to green vitriol (ferrous sulfate).

Some maintained calcanthum to be the same thing as colcothar, while others believed it was simply vitriol (sulfuric acid).

References

Webster's Revised Unabridged Dictionary (1913)

Alchemical substances
Sulfates